SeeMore's Playhouse is an American children's television series using puppets to teach preschoolers about health and safety concepts.

Characters
 SeeMore the Safety Seal 
 Harry Hippo - Puppeteered by Eric Wright
 Shades Wolf - Puppeteered by Eric Wright in season 1, David Stephens in season 2
 Basil Wombat - Puppeteered by Kenneth Mark Berman in season 1, David Fino in season 2
 Lottie Lamb - Puppeteered by Lindsey "Z" Briggs
 Penny Pup - Puppeteered by Sarah Frechette
 Barb Porcupine - Puppeteered by Carole Simms D'Agostino (Barb only appeared in Season 1, she was dropped in Season 2)
 Various characters - Puppeteered by Mark Gale and others

Segments 
The show has a few recurring segments in every episode

It's Knock-Knock Time! 
The puppets and guest celebrities will tell knock-knock jokes to other with a wall reminiscent of Rowan and Martin's Laugh-In.

An Adventure with Harry Hippo 
This series follows Harry Hippo trying to navigate the world around him.

Songs 
There are at least 2 songs in every episode. Every main puppet has sung at least once.

Episodes

Season 1 (2006)
 Hide and Seek (September 10, 2006)
 Party Planners (September 17, 2006)
 SeeMore Appreciation (September 24, 2006)
 The Talent Show (October 1, 2006)
 Make Believe (October 8, 2006)
 Basil's Surprise (October 15, 2006)
 Pool Yourself Together (October 22, 2006)
 Nature Walk (October 29, 2006)
 A Tale of Two Cyclists (November 5, 2006)
 Rock Song (November 12, 2006)
 Come on Team Play (November 19, 2006)
 Penny's Playground (November 26, 2006)
 1-555-Vegetables (December 3, 2006)

Season 2 (2007–2008)
 Power to Play (November 3, 2007)
 The Pickle Hat (November 10, 2007)
 Get Up, Get Out, Get Going (November 17, 2007)
 Ready, Set, Snow! Disaster Preparedness (November 24, 2007)
 Sweet & Sour (December 1, 2007)
 I'm Bigger Than You (December 8, 2007)
 Mrs. Bingley's Farm (December 15, 2007)
 Cool Rules (December 22, 2007)
 What's Cooking? (December 29, 2007)
 Marching Orders (January 5, 2008)
 Lost & Found (January 7, 2008)
 No Peanuts, Please! (January 8, 2008)
 Teacher's Pet (January 9, 2008)
 Harry's Check-Up (January 10, 2008)
 Lottie's Library Card (January 11, 2008)
 Home Theater (January 14, 2008)
 Take Me Out (January 15, 2008)

Home media
Only 2 DVDs of the series were produced.
Fire Safety
Car and Pedestrian Safety

Reception
Common Sense Media gave the show 3 out of 5 stars.

References

External links
 Safety4Kids: SeeMore's Playhouse
 

2000s American children's television series
2000s American music television series
2006 American television series debuts
2008 American television series endings
2000s preschool education television series
American children's musical television series
American preschool education television series
American television shows featuring puppetry
PBS Kids shows
PBS original programming
Television series about mammals